In mass communication, media are the communication outlets or tools used to store and deliver information or data. The term refers to components of the mass media communications industry, such as print media, publishing, the news media, photography, cinema, broadcasting (radio and television), digital media, and advertising.

The development of early writing and paper enabling longer-distance communication systems such as mail, including in the Persian Empire (Chapar Khaneh and Angarium) and Roman Empire, can be interpreted as early forms of media. Writers such as Howard Rheingold have framed early forms of human communication, such as the Lascaux cave paintings and early writing, as early forms of media. Another framing of the history of media starts with the Chauvet Cave paintings and continues with other ways to carry human communication beyond the short range of voice: smoke signals, trail markers, and sculpture.

The term media in its modern application relating to communication channels was first used by Canadian communications theorist Marshall McLuhan, who stated in Counterblast (1954): "The media are not toys; they should not be in the hands of Mother Goose and Peter Pan executives. They can be entrusted only to new artists because they are art forms." By the mid-1960s, the term had spread to general use in North America and the United Kingdom. The phrase mass media was, according to H.L. Mencken, used as early as 1923 in the United States.

The term medium (the singular form of media) is defined as "one of the means or channels of general communication, information, or entertainment in society, as newspapers, radio, or television."

Regulations 

The role of regulatory authorities (license broadcaster institutions, content providers, platforms) and the resistance to political and commercial interference in the autonomy of the media sector are both considered as significant components of media independence. In order to ensure media independence, regulatory authorities should be placed outside of governments' directives. this can be measured through legislation, agency statutes and rules.

Government regulations

Licensing 
In the United States, the Radio Act of 1927 established that the radio frequency spectrum was public property. This prohibited private organizations from owning any portion of the spectrum. A broadcast license is typically given to broadcasters by communications regulators, allowing them to broadcast on a certain frequency and typically in a specific geographical location. Licensing is done by regulators in order to manage a broadcasting medium and as a method to prevent the concentration of media ownership. 

Licensing has been criticized for an alleged lack of transparency. Regulatory authorities in certain countries have been accused of exhibiting political bias in favor of the government or ruling party, which has resulted in some prospective broadcasters being denied licenses or being threatened with license withdrawal. As a consequence, there has been a decrease in diversity of content and views in certain countries due to actions made against broadcasters by states via their licensing authorities. This can have an impact on competition and may lead to an excessive concentration of power with potential influence on public opinion.  Examples include the failure to renew or retain licenses for editorially critical media, reducing the regulator's competences and mandates for action, and a lack of due process in the adoption of regulatory decisions.

Government endorsed appointments 
State control is also evident in the increasing politicization of regulatory bodies operationalized through transfers and appointments of party-aligned individuals  to senior positions in regulatory authorities. Dr Anatol Lieven in his book explains how Pakistan, a less economically developed country, regulated it's media in 1980's.

Internet regulation 
Governments worldwide have sought to extend regulation to internet companies, whether connectivity providers or application service providers, and whether domestically or foreign-based. The impact on journalistic content can be severe, as internet companies can err too much on the side of caution and take down news reports, including algorithmically, while offering inadequate opportunities for redress to the affected news producers.

Self-regulation

At the regional level 
In Western Europe, self-regulation provides an alternative to state regulatory authorities. In such contexts, newspapers have historically been free of licensing and regulation, and there has been repeated pressure for them to self-regulate or at least to have in-house ombudsmen. However, it has often been difficult to establish meaningful self-regulatory entities.

In many cases, self-regulations exists in the shadow of state regulation, and is conscious of the possibility of state intervention. In many countries in Central and Eastern Europe, self-regulatory structures seems to be lacking or have not historically been perceived as efficient and effective.

The rise of satellite delivered channels, delivered directly to viewers, or through cable or online systems, renders much larger the sphere of unregulated programing. There are, however, varying efforts to regulate the access of programmers to satellite transponders in parts of the Western Europe and North American region, the Arab region and in Asia and the Pacific. The Arab Satellite Broadcasting Charter was an example of efforts to bring formal standards and some regulatory authority to bear on what is transmitted, but it appears to not have been implemented.

International organizations and NGOs 
Self-regulation is expressed as a preferential system by journalists but also as a support for media freedom and development organizations by intergovernmental organizations such as UNESCO and non-governmental organizations. There has been a continued trend of establishing self-regulatory bodies, such as press councils, in conflict and post-conflict situations.

Major internet companies have responded to pressure by governments and the public by elaborating self-regulatory and complaints systems at the individual company level, using principles they have developed under the framework of the Global Network Initiative. The Global Network Initiative has grown to include several large telecom companies alongside internet companies such as Google, Facebook and others, as well as civil society organizations and academics.

The European Commission’s 2013 publication, ICT Technology Sector Guide on Implementing the United Nations Guiding Principles on Business and Human Rights, impacts on the presence of independent journalism by defining the limits of what should or should not be carried and prioritized in the most popular digital spaces.

Private sector 

Public pressure on technology giants has motivated the development of new strategies aimed not only at identifying ‘fake news’, but also at eliminating some of the structural causes of their emergence and proliferation. Facebook has created new buttons for users to report content they believe is false, following previous strategies aimed at countering hate speech and harassment online. These changes reflect broader transformations occurring among tech giants to increase their transparency. As indicated by the Ranking Digital Rights Corporate Accountability Index, most large internet companies have reportedly become relatively more forthcoming in terms of their policies about transparency in regard to third party requests to remove or access content, especially in the case of requests from governments. At the same time, however, the study signaled a number of companies that have become more opaque when it comes to disclosing how they enforce their own terms of service, in restricting certain types of content and account. State governments can also use "Fake news" in order to spread propaganda.

Fact-checking and news literacy 
In addition to responding to pressure for more clearly defined self-regulatory mechanisms, and galvanized by the debates over so-called ‘fake news’, internet companies such as Facebook have launched campaigns to educate users about how to more easily distinguish between ‘fake news’ and real news sources. Ahead of the United Kingdom national election in 2017, for example, Facebook published a series of advertisements in newspapers with ‘Tips for Spotting False News’ which suggested 10 things that might signal whether a story is genuine or not. There have also been broader initiatives bringing together a variety of donors and actors to promote fact-checking and news literacy, such as the News Integrity Initiative at the City University of New York’s School of Journalism. This 14 million USD investment by groups including the Ford Foundation and Facebook was launched in 2017 so its full impact remains to be seen. It will, however, complement the offerings of other networks such as the International Fact-Checking Network launched by the Poynter Institute in 2015 which seeks to outline the parameters of the field. Instagram has also created a way to potentially expose "fake news" that is posted on the site. After looking in to the site, it seemed as more than a place for political memes, but a weaponized platform, instead of the creative space it used to be. Since that, Instagram has started to put warning labels on certain stories or posts if third-party fact checkers believe that false information is being spread. Instagram works with these fact checkers to ensure that no false information is being spread around the site. Instagram started this work in 2019, following Facebook with the idea as they started fact checking in 2016.

Electronic media

Developments in telecommunications has provided media the ability to conduct long-distance communication via analog and digital media:

 Analog telecommunications include some radio systems, historical telephony systems, and historical television broadcasts.
 Digital telecommunications allow for computer-mediated communication, telegraphy, computer networks, digital radio, digital telephony and digital television.

Modern communication media includes long-distance exchanges between larger numbers of people (many-to-many communication via e-mail, Internet forums, and telecommunications ports). Traditional broadcast media and mass media favor one-to-many communication (television, cinema, radio, newspaper, magazines, and social media).

See also

Distributed presence
Media franchise
Media manipulation
Media psychology
Media and gender
Press conference

Sources

References

Further reading

 McQuail, Denis (2001) McQuail's Mass Communication Theory (fourth edition), Sage, London, pp. 16–34. MAS
 Biagi, S. (2004). Media Impact. Wadsworth Pub Co, 7th edition.
 Caron, A. H. and Caronia, L. (2007). Moving cultures: mobile communication in everyday life. McGill-Queen's University Press.

Communication